The Nokia N70 is a 3G smartphone from Nokia. It was announced as part of the Nokia's new line of multimedia smartphones, the Nseries, on 27 April 2005. It started shipping in September 2005. It runs on the S60 2nd Edition, Feature Pack 3 on Symbian v8.1 operating system. It was succeeded by the Nokia N73. The N70 was popular and sold well.

Features 

The Nokia N70 (Model N70-1) is one of the handsets in Nokia's Nseries lineup of smart phones. It is equipped with a 2-megapixel camera with built-in flash, a front VGA camera to allow video calling, FM radio, Bluetooth, digital music player functionality, and support for 3D Symbian, Java games and other S60 2nd Edition software.

At the time of its launch, the N70 had the most built-in memory alongside its system memory and was the penultimate (before the related N72) Symbian OS 8.x device released by Nokia, since the introduction of their new OS9 platform released in 2003 which offers more flexibility than the original that was made in 1998 and upgraded from then on.

In 2006, Nokia released N70 Music Edition phone.

Specification sheet

N70-5 model

The N70-5 is a variant of the N70 without 3G or a front camera. It was shipped to China, Mexico and East Europe markets and provides a lower-cost option for users who do not want or need 3G services.

Music Edition
In 2006, Nokia released its Music Edition series for N70, N73 and N91. All had black housing and new sales boxes and packages, and were special for their extra storage capacity as compared to the standard models.  Music Edition of the N70-1 model featured a 1 GB memory card, 3.5 mm audio adapter with  remote control (AD-41), headphones (HS-28), dedicated music button in place of the multimedia key button. The Music edition also features new themes colored in Green called Stave and colored in Red called Waveform. The speakers and the Music interface of the phone has been improved.

Game Edition
January 29, 2007 also released Nokia N70 Game Edition only for Russia and Ukraine, which included several pre-installed games on the built-in memory card. Games: Asphalt 2: Urban GT, Real Football 3D 2006, Midnight Pool, Massive Snowboarding and Midnight Bowling.

See also
Nokia N97 mini

References

External links 

 Official Nokia N70 website
 Nokia's N70 page for developers

Reviews 
 Nokia N70 – Reviews by CNET: Asia, Australia and U.K.

Nokia Nseries
Mobile phones introduced in 2005